Opulence refers to great wealth or abundance.

It can also refer to:
 Opulence (EP), an extended-play album by rapper Brooke Candy
"Opulence", the first song from the EP
 Golden Opulence Sundae, the world-record most expensive sundae dessert